Fiskebäckskil is a locality in Lysekil Municipality, Västra Götaland County, Sweden, at the mouth of the Gullmarn fjord. It had 379 inhabitants in 2010. Once primarily a fishing community, it transformed into a shipping community in the 19th century and currently is a thriving tourist resort.

Notable residents
Elise Hwasser (1831-1894), stage actress
Johan Hjalmar Théel (1848-1937) Marine zoologist, director of local zoological station 1892–1908
 (1946–) British marine biologist
Carl Wilhelmson (1866–1928) Artist and professor

References 

Populated places in Västra Götaland County
Populated places in Lysekil Municipality